was a Japanese astronomer. He studied both major and minor planets, and discovered multiple asteroids.

Koishikawa was a staff member of the Sendai Astronomical Observatory frin 1972. His research was based out of the Sendai's Ayashi (391) station. The main-belt asteroid 6097 Koishikawa, discovered by Kin Endate and Kazuro Watanabe at Kitami in 1991, was named in his honor. He died on 26 August 2020 from lung cancer.

List of discovered minor planets

See also

References 
 

1952 births
2020 deaths
Deaths from lung cancer
Discoverers of asteroids

20th-century Japanese astronomers